The list of modern fan conventions for various genres of entertainment extends to the first conventions held in the 1930s.

Some fan historians claim that the 1936 Philadelphia Science Fiction Conference, a.k.a. Philcon, was the first science fiction convention ever held. Others, such as Fred Patten and Rob Hansen, make this claim for the January 1937 event in Leeds, England, organized by the Leeds Science Fiction League, which was specifically organized as a conference, with a program and speakers. Out of this came the first incarnation of the British Science Fiction Association.

While a few conventions were created in various parts of the world within the period between 1935 and 1960, the number of convention establishments increased slightly in the 1960s and then increased dramatically in the 1970s, with many of the largest conventions in the modern era being established during the latter decade. Impetuses for further establishment of local fan conventions include:

 The return of superhero characters and franchises during the Silver Age of Comic Books (1956-1970)
 science fiction adaptations for television serials (e.g., Star Trek) in the 1960s-1970s
 the growth of role-playing (in the 1970s and 1980s) as a genre of tabletop, live-action and eventually video/computer gaming, which not only inspired roleplay of favorite characters in full-body costumes but also inspired existing franchises to adapt their themes for said methods of gaming
 the growth in home taping (starting with VHS in the late 1970s) of television broadcasts, including popular serials.
 the growth of computerized communication, including the Internet and Internet-dependent applications in the 1980s and 1990s.

1930s
 Philcon (1936)
 Worldcon (1939)

1940s
 Boskone (1941)
 Eastercon (1948)
 Westercon (1948)

1950s
 Disclave (1950–1997)
 Midwestcon (1950)
 Lunacon (1957)

1960s
 MileHiCon (1960)
 Nihon SF Taikai (1962)
 DeepSouthCon (1963)
 First Long Beach Science Fantasy Convention (1963)
 Second Long Beach Science Fantasy Convention (1964)

1965 
 Academy Con 
 Detroit Triple Fan Fair
 Lucca Comics & Games — at that point known as "Salone Internazionale del Comics"
 Marcon

1966 
 Balticon

1967 
 Houstoncon

1968 
 British Comic Art Convention
 Comic Art Convention
 Minicon

1969
 Aggiecon
 Bubonicon
 ConQuesT

1970s
 Multicon (1970–1982)
 Comic-Con — at that point called the "Golden State Comic-Con"

1971
 Arcana
 Creation Con 
 Novacon
 VCON

1972
 Chicago Comic-Con — at that point called "Nostalgia '72"
 Eurocon
 Salón Internacional del Cómic del Principado de Asturias, Asturias, Spain (1972–2014)

1973
 Loscon
 Windycon

1974
 Angoulême International Comics Festival
 ConFusion
 LepreCon
 OrlandoCon
 TusCon

1975
 Atlanta Fantasy Fair (1975–1995)
 Comiket, Tokyo, Japan
 Icon (Iowa)
 NASFIC
 SwanCon
 Unicon (1975–1989)
 World Fantasy Convention

1976
 ConClave
 Chattacon
 Stellarcon

1977
 Archon
 CoastCon
 MidSouthCon
 Starfest
 Strip Turnhout Turnhout, Antwerp, Belgium — biennial show
 Wiscon
 OKON

1978
 MediaWest*Con
 Norwescon

1979
 ArmadilloCon
 FantaCon, Albany, New York (1979–1990; 2013)
 NatCon (New Zealand)
 OryCon

1980s

1980
 Ad Astra
 Mid-Ohio Con

1981
 Barcelona International Comics Convention
 Capricon
 InConJunction

1982
 BayCon
 Dallas Fantasy Fair (1982–1995)
 Heroes Convention
 I-CON (1982)
 Life, the Universe, & Everything
 Microcon

1983
 Comix Fair (1983–c. 1996) — Houston, TX
 SFeraKon
 SoonerCon

1984
 Con-Version
 Ohio Valley Filk Fest
 Polcon
 United Kingdom Comic Art Convention (UKCAC)
 Vulkon — at that point known as "Trekon"

1986
 Finncon
 Magnum Opus Con (1986–2001)
 Polaris

1987
 Confluence 
 Dragon Con
 Readercon
 WonderCon

1988
 Starbase Indy
 Starfleet International Conference

1989
 Festival of Fantastic Films
 Motor City Comic Con

1990s

1990
 Octocon
 Arisia
 Gallifrey One
 DemiCon
 CONduit
 MarsCon (Virginia)
 Visions (1990–1998)
 A-Kon

1991
 Escapade Con
 DucKon
 SiliCon

1992
 CAN-CON
 CAPTION
 Convencion de Juegos de Mesa y Comics
 FedCon
 Diversicon
 Dimension Jump
 Stripdagen Haarlem
 World Horror Convention

1993
 FACTS
 MegaCon
 ConDor

1994
 Alternative Press Expo
 BotCon
 G-Fest
 Memorabilia
 Pittsburgh Comicon
 Small Press Expo (SPX)

1995
 Armageddon
 Fan Expo Canada — then known as the "Canadian National Comic Book Expo"
 Electronic Entertainment Expo (E3)

1996
 Albacon
 Big Apple Convention — then known as "Halleluja Con"
 Festival fantazie
 Jornadas de Cómic (Aviles, Spain)

1997
 Conestoga
 ShadowCon
 Wizard World Chicago — takes over Chicago Comicon

1998
 ICon festival (Israel)
 MOBICON
 Swecon

1999
 Comic Festival — at that point known as "Comic 99"
 CONvergence
 EerieCon
 Festival Internacional de Quadrinhos (FIQ)
 Générations Star Wars et Science Fiction
 MarsCon (Minnesota)
 Star Wars Celebration
 WillyCon
 Pyrkon

2000s

2000
 Baltimore Comic-Con
 DeepCon
 Gatecon
 New York International Sci-Fi and Fantasy Creators Convention (2000–2002)
 Small Press and Alternative Comics Expo (SPACE)
 Trinoc*coN (2000–2008)
 UnCommonCon (2000–2001)

2001
 Capclave
 Coco Bulles (2001–2009)
 ConGlomeration
 Vericon

2002
 Adventure Con
 ConCarolinas
 ConDFW
 Dallas Comic Con
 East Coast Black Age of Comics Convention (ECBACC)
 MoCCA Festival
 Phoenix Comicon
 Supanova Pop Culture Expo, Australia

2003 
 Anime Boston
 Anime Friends
 Emerald City ComiCon
 TCAF
 Toronto Comic Con
 Monster-Mania Con
 ConBust Smith College Science Fiction/Fantasy Society Convention

2004
 ApolloCon
 Comic Expo (Bristol International Comic & Small Press Expo)
 Comics Salon (2004–2007) — Slovakia
 FenCon
 Itzacon
 Linucon (2004–2005)
 London Film and Comic Con
 Stumptown Comics Fest

2005
 Hypericon
 Komikazen
 MomoCon
 STAPLE!
 TimeGate

2006
 BabelCon
 Central Canada Comic Con — at this point known as the "Manitoba Comic Con"
 Lille Comics Festival
 Montreal Comic-con
 New York Comic Con
RavenCon

2007
 Lazy Dragon Con
 Geek.Kon
 Åcon

2008
 Comicpalooza
 Comics Fest India
 Hi-Ex
 SpoCon
 Gamescom (formerly Games Convention)

2009
 Brasil Game Show (BGS, formerly Rio Game Show (RGS))
 The North American Discworld Convention

2010s

2010
 Chicago Comic & Entertainment Expo (C2E2)
 SFContario (2010)
 Pensacola Comic Convention (2010)

2011
 BronyCon
 Comikaze Expo
 Treklanta (formerly TrekTrax Atlanta)

2012 
 Chicago Alternative Comics Expo (CAKE)
 Denver Comic Con (DCC)
 East Coast Comicon — then known as the "Asbury Park Comicon"
 London Super Comic Convention
 Rhode Island Comic Con
 Wildcat Comic Con

2013 
 Massachusetts Independent Comics Expo (MICE)
 Salt Lake Comic Con

2014 
 Comic Con Experience (CCXP)
 Kreepy Geek Con
 RuffleCon
 CONjuration

2015 
 Asia Pop Comic Convention
 Cartoon Crossroads Columbus
 Gamercom
 For the Love of Sci-Fi
 Rupaul's Drag Con

2016 
 Silicon Valley Comic Con

2017 
 Warsaw Comic Con

2018
Comic Con Africa
Comic Con Liverpool
Comic Con Scotland
Empire City Con: A Steven Universe Fan Convention
For the Love of Horror

References 

Lists of events